Megastorm may refer to:

Hypothetical storms
ARkStorm, a proposed 1-in-1,000 year atmospheric river event that could impact California with historic, extremely damaging flooding
Hypercane, hypothetical extreme tropical cyclones that could reach the size of continents and last for several weeks on average.

Other uses
Megastorm, a Predacon/Destron in the Transformers fictional universe

See also
Superstorm, a large, unusually-occurring, destructive storm without another distinct meteorological classification